John Betts may refer to:
 John Betts (physician) (c. 1623–1695), physician
 John Betts (Connecticut politician) (1650–1730), member of the House of Representatives of the Colony of Connecticut from Norwalk
 John Betts Jr. (1692–1767), member of the House of Representatives of the Colony of Connecticut from Norwalk
 John Edward Betts (1755–1832), English luthier
 Dr John Betts (surgeon and philanthropist) (1799–1875), founder of The St Peter's Hammersmith Free Schools
 John Betts (Canadian politician) (born 1949), member of the Legislative Assembly of New Brunswick for the riding of Moncton Crescent
 John Felton Betts (1854–1914), merchant and political figure in the Northwest Territories, Canada

See also 
 Betts, surname
 Jonathan Betts (born 1955), British horological scholar
 Joe Betts-LaCroix (born 1962), American computer company executive